Yeum Hye-seon (born ) is a South Korean volleyball player. She is part of the South Korea women's national volleyball team at the 2016 Summer Olympics and 2020 Summer Olympics. The team finished at fifth place in 2016 and fourth in 2020.

She participated in the 2014 FIVB Volleyball World Grand Prix. On club level she has played for Daejeon KGC since 2019.

References

External links
 Profile at FIVB.org

1991 births
Living people
South Korean women's volleyball players
People from Mokpo
Volleyball players at the 2016 Summer Olympics
Olympic volleyball players of South Korea
South Korean Buddhists
Volleyball players at the 2020 Summer Olympics